Sex and Zen (The Carnal Prayer Mat's Stash of Illicit Love) is a 1991 Hong Kong erotic sex comedy film directed by Michael Mak, and starring Lawrence Ng and Amy Yip. The film is loosely based on The Carnal Prayer Mat, a Chinese erotic novel by seventeenth century author and playwright Li Yu.

Plot
The story is about Mei Yeung-Sheng, a lustful scholar (Lawrence Ng), who dares to challenge the moral teachings of the Sack Monk. The monk attempts to lecture the scholar that spiritual enlightenment transcends the passions of the flesh but the scholar, who enjoys women, doesn't agree. However, Master Iron Doors, the most powerful man in the town, marries his daughter Huk-Yeung (Amy Yip) to the scholar. The daughter is a virgin and has been taught that sex is dirty.

Choi Kun-Lun, the flying thief (Lo Lieh), tells the scholar that stealing other men's wives requires good lovemaking skills and equipment. He promises to help the scholar only if he has a horse's penis. Of course, the thief does not think it is possible, until the scholar returns one day, indeed, with a horse's penis attached as his own. Apparently, the scholar met a doctor (a cameo by Hong Kong comedian Kent Cheng) who was able to replace anatomical parts.

The doctor managed to transplant a horse's penis to replace the scholar's meager one. Armed with his new 20-inch penis, the scholar goes on a sexual rampage, not caring if he is seducing other men's wives or is nearly caught in the process. Meanwhile, Huk-Yeung, after experiencing the joys of sex, becomes sexually frustrated. She tries masturbating with paintbrushes but is left unsatisfied until she has an affair with Wong Chut (Elvis Tsui), the husband of one of the wives the scholar seduced, who is now working as Yeung-Sheng's gardener. She becomes pregnant and runs away with him, who out of revenge sells her to a brothel. Mistress Ku, the madam (Carrie Ng), assaults her leading to a miscarriage, originally unwilling she is coerced into becoming a prostitute and comes to enjoy her new life.

The scholar has become frail and sick due to too much sex (involving two sisters-in-law who are bisexual and into S&M). He goes to the brothel for treatment, where he is offered the top courtesan. At first, husband and wife cannot recognize each other; she looks at his penis and thinks it cannot be her husband's because his is small; he cannot recognize her because his eyesight is failing.

While they are having sex, he takes a close look at her figure and nipple and recognizes her. To her dismay, he screams, shouts and calls her a disgrace. To his dismay, she runs off and hangs herself. Yeung-Sheng, completely broken, goes back to the monk to ask for forgiveness.

Box office
In Hong Kong, the film grossed HK$18,424,224. This was enormous business considering the film was saddled with the restrictive Category III rating (the Hong Kong equivalent of NC-17 in the US).

Sequels
Sex and Zen went on to spin off two sequels, Sex and Zen II and Sex and Zen III. These are not sequels in plot, as each movie illustrates a different story also based on the sex manual.

Cast
 Lawrence Ng - Mei Yeung-Sheng
 Amy Yip - Huk-Yeung/Chau-Yin
 Kent Cheng - Dr. Tin Chan
 Lo Lieh - Choi Kun-Lun
 Carrie Ng - Mistress Ku
 Isabella Chow - Shui Chu
 Rena Murakami - Fa Sun (as Tomoko Ino)
 Mari Ayukawa - Wong Chut's wife
 Tim Wong - Emil Wu
 Tien Feng - Master Iron Doors (uncredited)
 Elvis Tsui - Wong Chut (uncredited)

See also
 3D Sex and Zen: Extreme Ecstasy

References

External links
 
 Entry at lovehkfilm.com

 
Hong Kong sex comedy films
1991 films
1990s sex comedy films
1990s Cantonese-language films
Works based on The Carnal Prayer Mat
Adultery in films
Discotek Media
Films directed by Michael Mak
1991 comedy films
1990s Hong Kong films